Daniel Glomb (born: 22 December 1980 Curitiba) is a sailor from Brazil, who represented his country at the 1996 Summer Olympics in Savannah, United States as helmsman in the Soling. With crew members Edson de Araújo, Jr. and Marcelo Reitz they took the 21st place.

References

1980 births
Living people
Sailors at the 1996 Summer Olympics – Soling
Olympic sailors of Brazil
Sportspeople from Curitiba
Brazilian male sailors (sport)